The 2003 Recopa Sudamericana was the 11th edition of the match-up contested between the winners of CONMEBOL's two continental tournaments. This was the first Recopa contested since 1999 when the competition was discontinued due to the Supercopa Sudamericana folding in 1997. However, in 2002 the Copa Sudamericana was created to serve as the second most important continental trophy. Thus, the Recopa Sudamericana became playable again pitting the winners of the Copa Libertadores and Copa Sudamericana. The first Recopa Sudamericana under this format took place in a single final held at Los Angeles Memorial Coliseum in Los Angeles.

The match was contested by Olimpia, winners of the 2002 Copa Libertadores, and San Lorenzo de Almagro, winners of the 2002 Copa Sudamericana, on July 12, 2003. Olimpia defeated San Lorenzo to win their second Recopa Sudamericana.

Qualified teams

Match details

References

2003
Club Olimpia matches
San Lorenzo de Almagro matches
Rec
2003 in American soccer
2003